Matthew Abramo Gallagher (born 26 October 1996) is an English rugby union player for Bath in the Gallagher Premiership. His primary position is fullback, though can also play on either wing. Gallagher's father is John Gallagher, who won the 1987 Rugby World Cup with New Zealand.

Professional career
Gallagher made his senior competitive debut for Saracens against Welsh side Ospreys in November 2014. He was voted the Saracens Academy Player of the Year following strong performances for Saracens Storm during the 2015–16 Premiership Rugby A-League, as well as helping loan club Old Albanian secure promotion to National League 1 after winning the 2015–16 National League 2 South play-offs. He joined Bedford Blues as a dual-registered player ahead of the 2016–17 season, though he was soon called into action for Saracens.

Gallagher joined Irish United Rugby Championship side Munster on a two-year contract from the 2020–21 season, and made his competitive debut for the province in their 2020–21 Pro14 round two fixture against Scottish side Edinburgh on 10 October 2020, which Munster won 25–23. Gallagher scored his first tries for Munster in their 28–16 win against Dragons on 1 November 2020.

Gallagher returned to England to join Premiership Rugby club Bath, where Munster head coach Johann van Graan and defence coach JP Ferreira also joined, ahead of the 2022–23 season.

International career
Gallagher was selected for the England under-20s at the 2016 World Rugby Under 20 Championship, and he started in the 45–21 win against Ireland under-20s in the final.

Through his father, John, Gallagher is qualified to play for Ireland, as his paternal grandfather and grandmother are from Derry and Limerick respectively.

References

External links
Munster Profile
Saracens Profile

URC Profile

1996 births
Living people
Rugby union players from Sidcup
English rugby union players
Saracens F.C. players
Bedford Blues players
Munster Rugby players
Bath Rugby players
English expatriate rugby union players
Rugby union fullbacks
Rugby union wings